Mathias Wieman (Carl Heinrich Franz Mathias Wieman; 23 June 1902 – 3 December 1969) was a German stage-performer, silent-and-sound motion picture actor.

Life and career

Early life
Wieman was born in Osnabrück, the only son of Carl Philipp Anton Wieman and his wife Louise. Raised in Osnabrück, Wiesbaden and Berlin, where he studied four terms of philosophy, history of art and languages, Wieman wanted to actually become an airplane technical designer and flier. He started his acting career on the stage in Berlin under the direction of Max Reinhardt at the Deutsches Theater. In the early 1920s, he was a member of the Holtorf-Truppe, a stock theater group that included future director Veit Harlan. His fellow stage actors included his future wife, Erika Meingast, Marlene Dietrich, Dora Gerson and Max Schreck (the vampire in Nosferatu). Later he began working in silent and sound films; he landed supporting roles in Assassination, Queen Louise and Land Without Women. In 1930, along with Leni Riefenstahl, he appeared in Storm over Mont Blanc, and in 1932 he played the lead in Riefenstahl's The Blue Light.

At the height of his film career, during the decade of the 1930s, Wieman acted in such productions as Man Without a Name, L'Atlantide, The Countess of Monte Cristo, Fräulein Hoffmanns Erzählungen, The Rider on the White Horse, Victoria, Patriots, and Togger.

In 1936 Wieman produced the Frankenburger Würfelspiel of the Nazi playwright Eberhard Wolfgang Möller in association with the 1936 Summer Olympics and the inauguration of the Dietrich-Eckart-Bühne, and also played the Black Knight.

He also had an international success with his appearance in The Eternal Mask. The movie was awarded with the American National Board of Review Award for Best Foreign Film in the United States in 1937 (National Board of Review Awards 1937). The film was also nominated for an award at the Venice Film Festival. Also in 1937, Wieman was made Staatsschauspieler, an honorary title bestowed by the German government and the highest honour attainable by an actor in Germany.

1940s and after

Wieman was classed as "persona non grata" by Joseph Goebbels, this greatly reduced his activity. He acted in the following movies in the 1940s: Ich klage an, Her Other Self, Paracelsus, Dreaming and How Do We Tell Our Children?. After the failed 20 July plot to assassinate Adolf Hitler happened in 1944, Mathias and his wife Erika helped the family of Count Fritz-Dietlof von der Schulenburg. This assistance is detailed by Charlotte von der Schulenburg in the book Courageous Hearts: Women and the Anti-Hitler Plot of 1944
(Dorothee Von Meding, Berghahn Books, 1997).

After World War II he was able to work more intensively in the film business again, normally in support roles. To his fairly well known work belongs No Greater Love, As Long as You're Near Me, The Last Summer, Ripening Youth, The Girl and the Legend, and opposite Ingrid Bergman in Roberto Rossellini's Fear. Two of the films Mathias starred in were in competition at the Cannes Film Festival: In 1952, No Greater Love; and in 1954, As Long as You're Near Me.

Wieman also made many records (LPs) of classic stories where he would narrate the story accompanied by orchestral music. One example is Peter und der Wolf with Mathias and the Berlin Philharmonic in 1950 conducted by Fritz Lehmann and the Orchestre National de France in 1962 conducted by Lorin Maazel. Another example is Mathias Wiemans kleine Diskothek.
In 1992 Deutsche Grammophon issued a commemorative set of CDs in honour of the 100th anniversary of Wieman's birth: Für Kenner & Kinder.

Stage work

On stage, Wieman appeared in a number of productions including, Goethe's Faust, Pygmalion (play) by George Bernard Shaw, the most famous play of Italian playwright Luigi Pirandello, Six Characters in Search of an Author, and in Bertolt Brecht's In The Jungle of Cities (Im Dickicht der Städte).

His many friends included such diverse people as Hanna Reitsch, Lida Baarova, Hans Fallada, Anny Ondra, and Fritz-Dietlof von der Schulenburg.

Later life
After World War II, Wieman moved to Switzerland with his wife, stage actress Erika Meingast, there in 1969 he died of cancer. Mathias and his wife Erika (died in 1972) were cremated and the ashes buried in the Wieman family plot in the Johannesfriedhof cemetery in Osnabrück.

Honours
In 1958, his hometown of Osnabrück awarded him the prestigious Justus-Möser-Medaille for his achievements in acting on stage and screen. 
And in 1965, Wieman received the Bambi Award.

Selected filmography

 A Free People (1925)
 Potsdam (1927)
 Der Sohn der Hagar (1927) as Dr. Friedlieb
 Out of the Mist (1927) as Grigori
 Mata Hari (1927) as Grigori
 Queen Louise (1927) as King Frederick William III
 Assassination (1927) as Irrsinniger
 The Merry Farmer (1927) as son Stephan Reuther
 The Runaway Girl (1928) as Vladimir Pekoff, ein Komponist
 Under the Lantern (1928) as Hans Grote
 Diary of a Coquette (1929) as Arzt
 Land Without Women (1929) as American Physician
 Love's Carnival (1930) as Hans Rudorff - Leutnant
 Storm over Mont Blanc (1930) as Walter Petersen
 The Golden Anchor (1932) as Marcus sein Sohn
 The Blue Light (1932) as Vigo
 The Countess of Monte Cristo (1932) as Stephan Riehl, Journalist
 L'Atlantide (1932) as Ivar Torstenson
 Man Without a Name (1932) as Dr. Alfred Sander
 Anna and Elizabeth (1933) as Mathias Testa
 Fräulein Hoffmanns Erzählungen (1933) as Benno Karden
 The Love Hotel (1933) as Klaus Petermann
 The Rider on the White Horse (1934) as Hauke Haien
 Achtung! Wer kennt diese Frau? (1934) as Artur von Bavro
 Das verlorene Tal (1934) as René von Eisten
 Little Dorrit (1934) as Arthur Clennam
 Suburban Cabaret (1935) as Josef Kernthaler, Bauzeichner
 The Eternal Mask (1935) as Dr. Dumartin
 Victoria (1935) as Johannes
 Togger (1937) as Peter Geis, Journalist
 Patriots (1937) as Peter Thomann - genannt Pierre
 Unternehmen Michael (1937) as Major Zur Linden
 Michelangelo: Life of a Titan (1938) (voice)
 Anna Favetti (1938) as Hemmstreet
 Die Hochzeitsreise (1939) as Dr. Paul Goethals
 Cadets (1939) as Rittmeister von Tzülow
 Ich klage an (1941) as Dr. Bernhard Lang
 Her Other Self (1941) as Ingenieur Martin
 Paracelsus (1943) as Ulrich von Hutten
 Man rede mir nicht von Liebe (1943) as Andreas Alwin
 Dreaming (1944) as Robert Schumann
 The Heart Must Be Silent (1944) as Dr. Paul Holzgruber
 How Do We Tell Our Children? (1949) as Dr. Thomas Hofer
 When a Woman Loves (1950) as Felder, Kunsthändler
 Melody of Fate (1950), as Martin Ehrling
 No Greater Love (1952) as Alfred Nobel
 As Long as You're Near Me (1953) as Paul, der Autor
 His Royal Highness (1953) as Dr. Raoul Überbein
 A Love Story (1954) as Fritz v. Fredersdorff, Gutsbesitzer
 The Last Summer (1954) as President Carlo Tolemainen
 Fear (1954) as Professor Albert Wagner
 Ripening Youth (1955) as Obersdtudiendirektor Dr. Berger
 If All the Guys in the World (1956) as Karl Baumeister
 The Marriage of Doctor Danwitz (1956) as Professor Schüddekopf
 The Girl and the Legend (1957) as King Georg II
 Wetterleuchten um Maria (1957) as Priest
 Der Sittlichkeitsverbrecher (1963) as Richter
 Erotikon - Karussell der Leidenschaften (1963)
 Geld und Geist (1966) as Pfarrer (final film role)

Notes

External links

Meingast Family Site with information about Mathias Wieman
Photographs of Mathias Wieman
 Excellent and detailed web site about Wieman by the late Dieter Svensson
 Mathias Wieman and Erika Meingast gravesite in the Osnabrücker Johannesfriedhof
"Unternehmen Michael" - 1937 World War 1 drama. Full length.
Bust of Mathias Wieman recently discovered at the University of Vienna (in German).
Blog (in German) by Thomas Hunziker about "The Eternal Mask" being shown at the 2010 Neuchâtel International Fantastic Film Festival.
"New York Times" review of "Unternehmen Michael" (The Private's Job). Cursor down to under "At the 86th St. Garden Theatre" for the review. Nugent, Frank S., "Goodbye Broadway," New York Times, 14 May 1938. 
Information about a portrait done of Mathias Wieman by artist Hans Jürgen Kallmann.

1902 births
1969 deaths
German male film actors
German male silent film actors
German male stage actors
People from the Province of Hanover
People from Osnabrück
20th-century German male actors